A hoard or "wealth deposit" is an archaeological term for a collection of valuable objects or artifacts, sometimes purposely buried in the ground, in which case it is sometimes also known as a cache. This would usually be with the intention of later recovery by the hoarder; hoarders sometimes died or were unable to return for other reasons (forgetfulness or physical displacement from its location) before retrieving the hoard, and these surviving hoards might then be uncovered much later by metal detector hobbyists, members of the public, and archaeologists.

Hoards provide a useful method of providing dates for artifacts through association as they can usually be assumed to be contemporary (or at least assembled during a decade or two), and therefore used in creating chronologies. Hoards can also be considered an indicator of the relative degree of unrest in ancient societies. Thus conditions in 5th and 6th century Britain spurred the burial of hoards, of which the most famous are the Hoxne Hoard, Suffolk; the Mildenhall Treasure, the Fishpool Hoard, Nottinghamshire, the Water Newton hoard, Cambridgeshire, and the Cuerdale Hoard, Lancashire, all preserved in the British Museum. 

Prudence Harper of the Metropolitan Museum of Art voiced some practical reservations about hoards at the time of the Soviet exhibition of Scythian gold in New York City in 1975. Writing of the so-called "Maikop treasure" (acquired from three separate sources by three museums early in the twentieth century, the Berliner Museen, the University of Pennsylvania Museum of Archaeology and Anthropology, and the Metropolitan Museum, New York), Harper warned:

Such "dealer's hoards" can be highly misleading, but better understanding of archaeology amongst collectors, museums and the general public is gradually making them less common and more easily identified.

Classification 

Hoards may be of precious metals, coinage, tools or less commonly, pottery or glass vessels. There are various classifications depending on the nature of the hoard.

A founder's hoard contains broken or unfit metal objects, ingots, casting waste, and often complete objects, in a finished state. These were probably buried with the intention to be recovered at a later time.

A merchant's hoard is a collection of various functional items which, it is conjectured, were buried by a traveling merchant for safety, with the intention of later retrieval.

A personal hoard is a collection of personal objects buried for safety in times of unrest.

A hoard of loot is a buried collection of spoils from raiding and is more in keeping with the popular idea of "buried treasure".

Votive hoards are different from the above in that they are often taken to represent permanent abandonment, in the form of purposeful deposition of items, either all at once or over time for ritual purposes, without intent to recover them. Furthermore, votive hoards need not be "manufactured" goods, but can include organic amulets and animal remains. Votive hoards are often distinguished from more functional deposits by the nature of the goods themselves (from animal bones to diminutive artifacts), the places buried (being often associated with watery places, burial mounds and boundaries), and the treatment of the deposit (careful or haphazard placement and whether ritually destroyed/broken).

Valuables dedicated to the use of a deity (and thus classifiable as "votive") were not always permanently abandoned. Valuable objects given to a temple or church become the property of that institution, and may be used to its benefit.

Hoards with individual articles

Asia
 Akota Bronzes
 Bactrian Gold
 Chausa hoard
 Copper Hoard Culture
 Kfar Monash Hoard
 Priam's Treasure
 Wonoboyo hoard
 Ziwiye hoard

Europe

Great Britain and the Channel Islands

 Beau Street Hoard
 Bitterley Hoard
 Canterbury-St Martin's hoard
 Cheapside Hoard
 Collette Hoard
 Corbridge Hoard
 Cuerdale Hoard
 Cunetio Hoard
 Frome Hoard
 Galloway Hoard
 Grouville Hoard
 Havering hoard
 Hexham Hoard
 Hoxne Hoard
 Isleham Hoard
 Kirkoswald Hoard
 Lenborough Hoard
 Leominster hoard
 Middleham Hoard
 Migdale Hoard
 Mildenhall Treasure
 Milton Keynes Hoard
 Rogiet Hoard
 Shapwick Hoard
 Shrewsbury Hoard
 Silsden Hoard
 Snettisham Hoard
 St Leonard's Place Hoard
 Staffordshire Hoard
 Stanchester Hoard
 Stirling Hoard
 Talnotrie Hoard
 Thetford Hoard
 Thornbury Hoard
 Tregwynt Hoard
 Upchurch Hoard
 Vale of York Hoard (previously known as Harrogate hoard)
 Water Newton Treasure
 West Bagborough Hoard
 West Yorkshire Hoard
 Wickham Market Hoard
 Winchester Hoard
 Wold Newton hoard

Ireland
 Ardagh Hoard
 Broighter Hoard
 Derrynaflan Hoard
 Dowris Hoard
 Mooghaun North Hoard

Continental

 Lampsacus Treasure, Turkey
 First Cyprus Treasure, Cyprus
 Berthouville Treasure, France (relating to the Romans)
 Borovo Treasure, part of the Thracian treasure
 Broighter Gold, Northern Ireland (relating to the Iron Age La Tène culture)
 Casco de Leiro, Spain (relating to the Bronze Age)
 Chatuzange Treasure, France (relating to Roman silver)
 Cheste hoard, Spain (relating to the Second Punic War)
 Eberswalde Hoard, Germany (relating to the Bronze Age)
 Paramythia Hoard, Greece (relating to Greco-Roman artefacts)
 Pereshchepina Treasure, Ukraine (relating to the Bulgars)
 Pietroasele Treasure, Romania (relating to the Goths)
 Preslav Treasure, Bulgaria (relating to the Byzantines)
 Reka Devnia Hoard, Bulgaria (relating to the Romans)
 Saka Hoard, Estonia (12th century)
 Sevso Treasure, possibly Hungary (relating to the Romans)
 Treasure of El Carambolo, Spain (relating to the Tartessians)
 Treasure of Gourdon, France (gold from 5th or 6th century)
 Treasure of Guarrazar, Spain (relating to the Visigoths)
 Treasure of Villena, Spain (relating to the Bronze Age)
 Ubina Hoard, Estonia (12th century)
 Vinkovci Treasure

Scandinavia

 Molnby Hoard, Sweden (relating to the Viking age)
 Sandur Hoard, Faroe Islands (relating to the Viking age)
 Spillings Hoard, Sweden (relating to the Viking age)
 Sundveda Hoard, Sweden (relating to the Viking age)

North Africa and Middle East 
 Asyut Treasure
 Megiddo Treasure, a hoard found at Tel Megiddo, Israel
 Nahal Mishmar hoard
 Kaper Koraon Treasure, Syria

North America
 Baltimore gold hoard
 Bank of New York Hoard
 Castine Hoard
 Saddle Ridge Hoard
 Dawson Film Find

See also

 Lagerstätte, a concentration of fossils useful for similar reasons in paleontology
 List of hoards in Britain
 List of hoards in Ireland
 List of missing treasure
 Hacksilver
 Treasure
 Treasure trove

References

Archaeological artifacts
Treasure